Horatio Curtis Benton (August 26, 1885 – September 14, 1938) was an American actor and screenwriter for silent films and early talkies. Born in Toledo, Ohio, Benton, attended Vanderbilt University and embarked upon a stage career in 1903, appearing with Robert Hilliard in A Fool There Was, and two seasons with Cohan and Harris' company where he played parts in The Fortune Hunter, Broadway Jones, and others. His film career included supporting roles in The Pursuit Eternal (1915), Conscience (1915) (which he also wrote), 20,000 Leagues Under the Sea (1916), Jealousy (1916), The Siren (1917), Fireman, Save My Child (1932) and Kid Galahad (1937).  His writing credits include The Uninvited Guest (1924), It Is the Law (1924), and The Phantom Bullet (1926). In his later years he was a boxing announcer at the Hollywood Stadium. He died in Hollywood in 1938 after a six-months illness.

References

External links

1885 births
1938 deaths
American male silent film actors
20th-century American male actors
American male screenwriters
Vanderbilt University alumni
Actors from Ohio
20th-century American screenwriters